Jeng Kirchen (December 13, 1919 in Hostert – November 30, 2010) was a Luxembourgish road racing cyclist who twice finished 5th in the Tour de France. Kirchen won his native race, the Tour de Luxembourg, in 1952, and took a total of 16 professional wins. He was the uncle and great-uncle of fellow cyclists Erny Kirchen and Kim Kirchen.

Major results

1943
4th, Overall, Tour de Luxembourg
1945
1st, Metz - Luxembourg
11th, Grand Prix des Nations
1946
 National Road Race Champion
1st, Stage 4, Tour de Luxembourg
7th, Overall, Tour de Luxembourg
1947
3rd, Overall, Tour de Luxembourg
18th, Overall, Tour de France
1948
 National Cyclo-cross Championships
5th, Overall, Tour de Suisse
5th, Overall, Tour de France
1949
13th, Overall, Tour de France
1950
3rd, Overall, Tour de Luxembourg
4th, Overall, Tour de Suisse
5th, Overall, Tour de France
1951
 National Road Race Champion
4th, Overall, Deutschland Tour
7th, Overall, Tour de Luxembourg
7th, Overall, Tour de Suisse
1952
 National Cyclo-cross Championships
 1st  Overall Tour de Luxembourg
6th, Overall, Deutschland Tour
1953
10th, Overall, Tour de Luxembourg

References

External links

1919 births
2010 deaths
Luxembourgian male cyclists
People from Niederanven